Abhimanyu Puranik (born 11 February 2000, Mumbai) is an Indian chess player who holds the title of chess grandmaster (GM, 2017).

Biography
In 2016 and 2018, Abhimanyu Puranik scored 5.5 points out of 9 in the main tournament of the Isle of Man Open chess festival. In January 2019, he shared 1st-4th place at the IIFL Wealth Mumbai Open international chess tournament with 7 points out of 9 and finished third in the tie-break. Then in July 2019, he took 2nd place in the Bienne chess festival open tournament.

In 2018, Abhimanyu Puranik was runner-up at the World Junior Chess Championship. In 2021, with the Indian team, he won the Asian Students Team Championship.

In 2021, in Riga Abhimanyu Puranik won the rapid chess tournament at the festival Riga Technical University Open.

In October 2019, in Isle of Man Abhimanyu Puranik finished 105th in the FIDE Grand Swiss Tournament.

Abhimanyu Puranik was silver medalist of the Bangladesh Team Championship 2021 with the Shaheen Chess Club, also became the best player on the second board at the tournament, scoring 8 out of 10 possible points.

For his success in tournaments, the FIDE awarded Abhimanyu Puranik the title of International Master (IM) in 2015 and International Grandmaster (GM) in 2017.

References

External links

2000 births
Sportspeople from Mumbai
Indian chess players
Chess grandmasters
Living people